Bitam Airport  is an airport serving the town of Bitam in Woleu-Ntem Province, Gabon.

See also

List of airports in Gabon
Transport in Gabon

References

External links

Airports in Gabon
Woleu-Ntem Province